Dongguangang railway station is a railway station in Dongguan, Guangdong, China. It is an intermediate stop on the Guangzhou–Shenzhen intercity railway and was opened on 15 December 2019.

The station has two side platforms.

References 

Railway stations in Guangdong
Railway stations in China opened in 2019